Ecpyrrhorrhoe rubiginalis is a species of moth of the family Crambidae. It was described by Jacob Hübner in 1796 and is found in central and southern Europe.

The wingspan is 16–22 mm.

The larvae feed on Stachys officinalis, Galeopsis tetrahit and Ballota nigra.

References

Pyraustinae
Moths of Europe
Moths described in 1796